CTO Hospital is a major medical center in Turin, Italy.  CTO stands for Centro Traumatologico Ortopedico or the Center for Orthopedic Trauma.  It is one of the leading orthopedic hospitals in Italy, and services a majority of orthopedic trauma incidents occurring in the Italian Alps.  The hospital also serves as a teaching hospital for local medical faculties, particularly the University of Turin.

History
The hospital was founded in 1961.

2006 Winter Olympics
CTO served as one of the main orthopedic hospitals for athletes, team members, and spectators for the 2006 Winter Olympics.

Capabilities
The hospital maintains a helipad, allowing a fleet of public and private air ambulances to transport patients to and from the hospital.  At any given time, the helipad is home to the Agusta-Bell AB 412 or other air ambulance rotary craft.

Notable treatments
CTO continues to specialize in the use of the Ilizarov apparatus for complex limb fractures.  It is one of the leading hospitals in the world for the treatment of complex leg tibial-fibular fractures and other complex fractures, particularly those found in skiing accidents and mountaineering accidents.

See also
Ilizarov apparatus
Torino Lingotto railway station
Torino Lingotto metro station

References

Hospital buildings completed in 1961
Hospitals in Turin
Buildings and structures in Turin